Starikov is a Russian surname. Notable people with the surname include:
 Filipp Starikov (1896–1980), Soviet military commander
 Nikolai Starikov (born 1970), Russian writer and journalist
 Sergei Starikov (born 1958), Russian ice hockey player and coach
 Yevgeni Starikov (born 1988), American footballer

Russian-language surnames